Roger de La Corbière (22 July 1893, Vouneuil-sur-Vienne - 3 September 1974, Paris) was a French painter, best known for his seascapes.  He worked primarily in watercolor, and is noted for his portrayals of the interaction between light and water.

References

1893 births
1974 deaths
20th-century French painters
20th-century French male artists
French male painters
People from Vienne